El Salvador competed at the 1972 Summer Olympics in Munich, West Germany, from 28 July to 12 August 1984. This was the nation's second appearance at the Olympics.

Comité Olímpico de El Salvador sent a total of 11 athletes to the Games, all men, to compete in 2 sports. Swimmer Salvador Vilanova was selected to carry his nation's flag during the opening ceremony.

Competitors 
Comité Olímpico de El Salvador selected a team of 11 athletes, all men, to compete in 2 sports. Skeet shooter Andrés Amador, at age 47, was the oldest athlete of the team, while swimmer Salvador Vilanova was the youngest at age 19.

The following is the list of number of competitors participating in the Games.

Shooting

Men

Swimming

Men

References

External links
Official Olympic Reports

Nations at the 1972 Summer Olympics
1972
Olympics